Jones Nunatak is a nunatak at the head of Noll Glacier,  west of Mount Schutz, in the Wilson Hills of Antarctica. It was mapped by the United States Geological Survey from surveys and U.S. Navy air photos, 1960–63, and was named by Advisory Committee on Antarctic Names for Frank E. Jones, Aviation Boatswain's Mate of U.S. Navy Squadron VX-6, a member of the aircraft ground handling crew at Williams Field, McMurdo Sound, during Operation Deep Freeze 1967 and 1968.

References

Nunataks of Oates Land